Statistics of Kuwaiti Premier League in the 1978–79 season.

Overview
Al Kuwait Kaifan won the championship.

References
RSSSF

1978–79
1978–79 in Asian association football leagues
football